Lydia Leonard (born 5 December 1981) is a British stage, film and television actress, best known for her roles in the television series Bring Up the Bodies, Ten Percent and The Crown.

Early life and education
Leonard was born in Paris to an Irish mother, a teacher, and Anglo-French father, an accountant; she lived in France until the age of five. She trained at the Bristol Old Vic Theatre School.

Career
Beginning her career in the theatre, Leonard played Anne Boleyn in the Royal Shakespeare Company's production of Hilary Mantel's Wolf Hall and Bring Up the Bodies at London's Aldwych Theatre from May until October 2014. The RSC production transferred to Broadway as Wolf Hall: Parts One and Two at the Winter Garden Theatre, running from March until July 2015. Leonard reprised the role, which earned her a nomination for the 2015 Tony Award for Best Featured Actress in a Play.

On television she had an ongoing role in 1950s-set detective series Jericho starring Robert Lindsay, and appeared in True True Lie (2006) and The Long Walk to Finchley (2008), along with a cameo in Rome (2006, "The Stolen Eagle"), and as a nurse in the BBC's Casualty 1909.

Leonard appeared on stage as Polyxena in a Royal Shakespeare Company production of Hecuba starring Vanessa Redgrave, the production played in London's West End and then at B.A.M in New York. She played Hazel Conway alongside Francesca Annis in the National Theatre's production of Time and the Conways. In 2005 she appeared as Caroline Cushing in the original Donmar Theatre and West End productions of Frost/Nixon. In 2010 Leonard played the role of Jackie Onassis in Martin Sherman's play Onassis at the Novello Theatre in London.

In 2008 Leonard played the female lead in the BBC remake of The 39 Steps. Part of the Christmas scheduling, its first showing was the most watched programme on BBC One on that day. 
Leonard starred as Cynthia in Joanna Hogg's 2010 feature film Archipelago.
In 2012, Leonard starred in two episodes of ITV drama series Whitechapel, as psychiatrist Morgan Lamb, for which she was nominated for Most Outstanding Actress at the Monte Carlo television awards.
In 2013 Leonard played a leading role in the action adventure film Legendary: Tomb of the Dragon alongside Dolph Lundgen and Scott Adkins. 
In 2013 Leonard played Alex Lang in DreamWorks The Fifth Estate starring Benedict Cumberbatch. In 2015, Leonard played Virginia Woolf in Life in Squares, a BBC miniseries on the Bloomsbury Group.

Between 2019-2022, Leonard appeared as Mariana Lawton in Gentleman Jack. 

In 2022, Leonard starred as Rebecca Fox in Ten Percent, the English version of the French original, Call My Agent!. That same year, Leonard appeared as Cherie Blair in series 5 of Netflix drama The Crown. On playing Blair, Leonard told the Evening Standard, I have a huge amount of respect for her. [...] It’s fun playing someone really famous. It brings its own interest from the wider audience and responsibility. Objectively I should care about playing a real living person, but I don’t, it’s just another character."

In March 2023, Leonard starred as in Women, Beware the Devil at the Almeida Theatre, London. The production was rated 3/5 stars by The Guardian.

Acting credits

Film

Television

Selected theatre credits
 The Meeting (Chichester Festival Theatre) 
 Oslo (National Theatre/ West End)
 Wolf Hall (RSC/ Broadway, Tony Award nomination for Best Featured Actress in a Play)
 Onassis (West End)
 Time and the Conways (National Theatre)
 Let There Be Love (Tricycle Theatre)
 Frost/Nixon (Donmar Warehouse/ West End)
 Hecuba (RSC)
 Women, Beware the Devil (Almeida)

Video games

Selected audio credits
The Colour of Murder, by Julian Symons, BBC Radio 4 2003, with Tom Smith, Lydia Leonard, Frances Jeater
A Sting in the Tale – Myrtle, Mahonia and Rue, by Briony Glassco, BBC Radio 4, 1//1/2004
Bunyan John – The Pilgrim's Progress, weekly from 4 January 2004, with Anton Rodgers, Neil Dudgeon, Alec McCowen, Anna Massey, Philip Voss, Lydia Leonard  
The Lair of the White Worm, by Stoker Bram, BBC World Service 4 December 2004, with Peter Marinker, Ben Crowe, Stephen Critchlow, Lydia Leonard, Richenda Carey
The Seagull, by Anton Chekhov, BBC World Service 18 March 2006, with Ben Silverstone, Lydia Leonard, Nicholas Farrell
Our Country's Good, by Thomas Keneally, adapted by Timberlake Wertenbaker, BBC World Service ~15 October 2005, with Nichloas Bolton, Lydia Leonard, Geoffrey Whitehead
How to Lose Friends and Alienate People, by Toby Young; R4 afternoon play 3 November 2006; with Val Murray, Kerry Shale, Lydia Leonard, Elizabeth Bell, Kim Wall.
Arms and the Man, by GB Shaw, BBC Radio 3 21 March 2010, with Rory Kinnear, Lydia Leonard, Hugh Ross, Frances Jeater

Awards and nominations

References

External links
 

1981 births
Living people
Alumni of Bristol Old Vic Theatre School
English stage actresses
People educated at Bedales School
Actresses from Paris
English radio actresses
English television actresses
21st-century English actresses
English people of French descent
English people of Irish descent